Héctor Hugo Ottensen Bravo (25 August 1946 – 29 August 2020), known as Hugo Ottensen, was a Chilean football player who played as a forward for clubs in Chile, Guatemala and El Salvador.

Career
As a child, Ottensen was with Club Santiago Bueras, where he coincided with his later fellow in Antofagasta Portuario, Germán Puchi. Ottensen played for both O'Higgins and Antofagasta Portuario in the top level of the Chilean football.

As an achievement, he became the top goalscorer of the 1976 Copa Fraternidad with 8 goals.

After he played for Independiente Nacional and Chalatenango.

Personal life
Ottensen made his home in El Salvador and died on 29 August 2020.

Honours

Individual
 Copa Fraternidad Top Goalscorer: 1976

References

External links
 Hugo Ottensen at PlaymakerStats.com
  

1946 births
2020 deaths
Chilean people of Danish descent
People from El Loa Province
Chilean footballers
Chilean expatriate footballers
O'Higgins F.C. footballers
C.D. Antofagasta footballers
C.D. Águila footballers
Alianza F.C. footballers
C.D. Chalatenango footballers
Chilean Primera División players
Liga Nacional de Fútbol de Guatemala players
Salvadoran Primera División players
Chilean expatriate sportspeople in Guatemala
Chilean expatriate sportspeople in El Salvador
Expatriate footballers in Guatemala
Expatriate footballers in El Salvador
Association football forwards